Siemens Mexico, also known as Siemens Mesoamerica, is a part of global Siemens. From a central regional headquarters in Mexico City and sales offices in other states of Mexico, Siemens coordinates and executes its business strategy, projects and corporate social responsibility activities in the whole country, and the Mesoamerican area, encompassing such Central American countries as: Guatemala, El Salvador,  Costa Rica, Dominican Republic and Panama; as well as countries in the Caribbean region.

References

External links

LinkedIn Portal 
Siemens Seeks $7.5 Billion Mexico Rail Deals

Mexico
Technology companies of Mexico
Companies based in Mexico City
Technology companies established in 1894
1894 establishments in Mexico